A dormitory (originated from the Latin word dormitorium, often abbreviated to dorm) is a building primarily providing sleeping and residential quarters for large numbers of people such as boarding school, high school, college or university students. In some countries, it can also refer to a room containing several beds accommodating people.

Terminology

Dorm and residence hall 
The term "dorm" is often used in the US. However, within the residence life community, the official term "residence hall" is preferred.  According to the University of Oregon, their facilities "provide not just a place to sleep, but also opportunities for personal and educational growth. Highly trained Residence Life staff and Hall Government officers support this objective by creating engaging activities and programs in each hall or complex."

In the UK, the preferred term in the context of student housing is "halls," short for "halls of residence." In English-speaking Canada, the common term is "residence" or "res" for short.

In Australia the terms "halls of residence" and "halls" are common, but "college" (or, more formally, "residential college") is also used in the cases of halls of residence that are named as such (e.g. Robert Menzies College, Trinity College, and Mannix College);  residential colleges commonly have a Christian ethos.

Dormitory, hall of residence, house, hostel and barracks 
In United Kingdom usage, the word dormitory means a room containing several beds accommodating unrelated people. In the United Kingdom, this arrangement exists typically for pupils at a boarding school, travellers or military personnel, but is almost entirely unknown for university students.

In United Kingdom usage, a building providing sleeping and residential quarters for large numbers of people is called a hall of residence (university students), house (members of a religious community or pupils at a boarding school), hostel (students, workers or travellers) or barracks (military personnel). In the United Kingdom, halls of residence almost entirely have single occupancy rooms, are almost always mixed sex, with residents being allocated to adjacent rooms regardless of sex.

Off-campus residence
Halls located away from university facilities sometimes have extra amenities such as a recreation room or bar. As with campus located residence halls, these off-campus halls commonly also have Internet facilities, either through a network connection in each student room, a central computer cluster room, or Wi-Fi. Catered halls may charge for food by the meal or through a termly subscription. They may also contain basic kitchen facilities for student use outside catering hours. Most halls contain a laundry room. As of 2015 there was an expanding market for private luxury off-campus student residences which offered substantial amenities in both the United States and Britain, particularly in London.

College and university dormitories

Most colleges and universities provide single or multiple occupancy rooms for their students, usually at a cost. These buildings consist of many such rooms, like an apartment building. The largest dormitory building is Bancroft Hall at the United States Naval Academy.

Many colleges and universities no longer use the word "dormitory" and staff are now using the term residence hall (analogous to the United Kingdom "hall of residence") or simply "hall" instead. Outside academia however, the word "dorm" or "dormitory" is commonly used without negative connotations.  Indeed, the words are used regularly in the marketplace as well as routinely in advertising.

United States 

Typically, a United States residence hall room holds two students with no toilet. This is usually referred to as a "double". Often, residence halls have communal bathroom facilities.
In the United States, residence halls are sometimes segregated by sex, with men living in one group of rooms, and women in another. Some dormitory complexes are single-sex with varying limits on visits by persons of each sex. For example, the University of Notre Dame in Indiana has a long history of Parietals, or mixed visiting hours. Most colleges and universities offer coeducational dorms, where either men or women reside on separate floors but in the same building or where both sexes share a floor but with individual rooms being single-sex. In the early 2000s, dorms that allowed people of opposite sexes to share a room became available in some public universities. Some colleges and university coeducational dormitories also feature coeducational bathrooms. Many newer residence halls offer single rooms as well as private bathrooms, or suite-style rooms.

Most residence halls are much closer to campus than comparable private housing such as apartment buildings. This convenience is a major factor in the choice of where to live since living physically closer to classrooms is often preferred, particularly for first-year students who may not be permitted to park vehicles on campus. Universities may therefore provide priority to first-year students when allocating this accommodation.

United Kingdom
In UK universities these buildings are usually called halls of residence (commonly referred to as halls), except at Oxford, Cambridge, Durham, York, Lancaster and Kent where the residential accommodation is incorporated in each college's complex of buildings, and simply known as rooms. Members of the college who live in its own buildings are usually said to be living in or living in college.

The majority of bedrooms in UK halls are now single occupancy – offering the first chance at privacy for some young people who shared bedrooms with siblings at home. Many universities offer a range of catering options, from fully catered (with meals served in a canteen or dining hall) to fully self-catered with kitchen facilities within the accommodation. Kitchens are usually shared, as are bathrooms in some halls, though en-suite rooms and self-contained studios are available in some universities for a higher price. At most universities, on-campus or university-owned halls of residence tend to be predominantly occupied by first-year students, and it is common for continuing students to move into privately rented accommodation such as house shares or purpose-built private halls for the remainder of their degree.

UK universities have seen increased funding from the Higher Education fees structure which has gradually been replacing direct grants from central government. This increasing reliance on income directly from students, as opposed entirely from direct taxation, in part, has led to an increase in the rental of student accommodation during the winter, spring, and summer vacation periods to house conference delegates and tourists, often at rates similar to those charged by upmarket hotels. During these periods students vacate their rooms if they are not required by them during non-term-time. As a result, several student-focused personal storage and shipping companies have appeared in order to cater for this need.

At some institutes in the UK, each residence hall has its own hall council. Where they exist, such individual councils are usually part of a larger organization called, variously, a residence hall association, a resident students' association, or a junior common room committee, which typically provides funds and oversees the individual building council. These student-led organizations are often connected together at a national level by the National Association of College and University Residence Halls (NACURH). Collectively, these hall councils plan social and educational events and voice student needs to their respective administration.

Purpose-built student accommodation (PBSA) has become more popular with developers, operators and students, with an ever increasing array of services and facilities provided in cluster accommodation and studio style apartments. Increasingly in the UK, new "off-campus" student accommodation is being built by private providers who market premium hotel-style rooms to international students at higher rates than are charged for university-owned rooms. Some of the companies which have developed such accommodation are based offshore to avoid tax.

Germany

In Germany there are dormitories called "Studentenwohnheim" (plural: Studentenwohnheime). Most Studentenwohnheime are run by the Studentenwerk (an organisation providing social, financial and cultural support services to students in Germany, comparable to student unions in the UK). Some Studentenwohnheime are run by a Catholic or Protestant church. Church-run facilities are sometimes single-sex.
Studentenwohnheime may be situated on or off campus. They are usually low cost and serve students with limited budget. Flats may be shared with other students or may be studio-type, with en-suite bathroom and kitchen facilities. The rooms themselves are mostly single occupancy.

India 
In India the dormitories are called "PG housing" or "student hostels". Even though most of the colleges/universities have hostels on-campus, however in most of the cases it is not enough for the total students enrolled. Majority of the students prefer to stay off-campus in PGs and private hostels as they usually have better amenities and services. For example, in 2015 estimated 1.8 lakh (180,000) students enrolled with Delhi University , there are only about 9,000 seats available in its hostels for both undergraduate and postgraduate students. The university admits an average of 54,000 students every year. Which leaves a majority of students to find accommodation off-campus. This has led to a lot of student hostel or student PG chains to be established near Delhi University.

France
In France dormitories are called "chambres universitaires" managed by regional public services called CROUS. They are usually located nearby or inside university campuses but many exceptions occur as universities may be settled within cities. Rooms are usually individual, costing around 300US$ per month with a collective kitchen and often collective bathrooms. Some "University cities" are famous such as the Cité Internationale Universitaire de Paris.

Hong Kong
Universities in Hong Kong are modeled on the British education system, with halls consequently being similar to those in the United Kingdom.

China

In China, dormitories are called "宿舍" (pinyin: sùshè). Dorms for mainland Chinese students usually have four to six students of the same sex living together in one room, with buildings usually being entirely gender-segregated and sometimes intentionally placed at some distance from each other to make inappropriate fraternization between male and female students more difficult. Sleeping hours may be enforced by cutting electricity at a given time, for instance at midnight.

Chinese students from Hong Kong, Macau and Taiwan live separately in their own dorms, as do foreigners. Mainlanders who are fluent in English or any foreign language may live in the foreigner- Hong Kong/Macau/Taiwan dorms, assuming they will be a roommate and participate in the foreign student activities, in order to help people get accustomed to mainland Chinese life. The quality of these dorms is usually better than that of mainland student dorms, with rooms either shared between only two people or completely private for a single student. Sexual decency attitudes are laxer than in mainlander dorms, with males and females sharing the same buildings and sometimes corridors  (though not rooms). Students are allowed to bring visitors – including mainlanders – of the opposite sex to their rooms. Guests may or may not be allowed to stay overnight, depending on the rules of the dorm. Electricity is usually available at all hours of the day.

Most dormitories for foreigners are run by the Foreign Students' Education Office (a department providing support services to students in China). They may be on campus or off campus. They are usually low cost and serve students.

Notable halls and complexes

Michigan State University, Ohio University, the University of Wisconsin–Milwaukee, the University of Texas at Austin, the University of Copenhagen, and London are six diverse and relevant examples of notable residential campuses that each display different relevances to contemporary dormitories in higher education.  Michigan State has the largest hall; Ohio possesses four residential greens built into the campus; Wisconsin-Milwaukee has four notable tower constructions to house students; Texas maintains a residence hall with several high-tech amenities; Copenhagen has one of the world's oldest residence halls; and London possesses one of the largest metropolitan living quarters for university students.

Rutgers University in New Brunswick, New Jersey has the largest residence hall system in the United States. 16,429 students live within a myriad of housing options, including apartments, suites and graduate housing. Freshmen are guaranteed on-campus housing to live on the 39,950+ student campus for at least their first year. Watterson Towers at Illinois State University are among the tallest residence halls in the world. The 28-story complex, which was built in 1967 holds over 2,200 students and its buildings are 91 meters tall.

Like many national universities, Ohio University includes its residence halls as a part of its campus architecture, augmenting the dormitories within plans for large sections of the urban campus.  Ohio University includes three primary quadrangle residential lawns, also known as "greens," that have dormitories surrounding the central area per each.  The greens, named for cardinal directions, include East Green, South Green, and West Green. Despite the appearance of the map, Voigt Hall and Scott Quadrangle are grouped onto East Green. There are no residence halls on College Green.

The halls combined have a total housing capacity of 2,700 students.

In addition to being a private residence for students, Dobie also contains a small 2-story mall, restaurants, and specialty stores.

The Turku Student Village in Nummi, Turku has more than 4,700 dormitories, of which 138 are youth hostels. Notable landmarks in the area also include the more than 40-meter-high dormitory tower called Ikituuri, which maintains nearly 100 dormitories. The residents of the entire student village consist mainly of students from the University of Turku, Turku University of Applied Sciences and Åbo Akademi University.

The Valkendorfs Kollegium at the University of Copenhagen was founded in 1589. Though not as old as some of the colleges of Oxford and Cambridge, it is among the oldest dormitories in the world. In Canada, student dormitories are more commonly called "residences" and students live "in residence". The Stone Frigate at Royal Military College of Canada in Kingston, Ontario was constructed in 1820 to store part of the dismantled fleet from the War of 1812.  The former warehouse was converted into a residence and classrooms when the college was established in 1874. The Stone Frigate, a designated heritage building, was closed for more than 18 months for major renovations to the interior and exterior of the residence. The Capstone House at University of South Carolina in Columbia, South Carolina completed in 1967, standing at 18 stories, has the only revolving restaurant on an American college campus located on the 18th floor known as Top of Carolina Dining Room.

It was completed in 2010 and claimed the title from the previous record holder, Sky Plaza in Leeds which stands just two metres lower.

Hall councils and staffing

Hall councils 
At some institutes, each residence hall has its own hall council. Where they exist, such individual councils are usually part of a larger organization called, variously, residence hall association, resident students' association, or junior common room committee which typically provides funds and oversees the individual building council.  These student-led organizations are typically connected at a national level by the National Association of College and University Residence Halls (NACURH).  Collectively, these hall councils plan social and educational events, and voice student needs to their respective administration.

Staffing 
In the United States, university residence halls are normally staffed by a combination of both students and professional residence life staff. Student staff members, Resident Assistants, or community advisers act as liaisons, counselors, mediators and policy enforcers. The student staff is supervised by a graduate student or a full-time residence life professional, sometimes known as the hall director. Staff members frequently arrange programming activities to help residents learn about social and academic life during their college life.

In the United Kingdom, halls often run a similar setup to that in the U.S, although the resident academic responsible for the hall is known by the term of "warden" and may be supported by a team of vice-wardens, sub-wardens or senior-members; forming the SCR (Senior Common Room). These are often students or academic staff at the relevant university/college. Many UK halls also have a JCR (Junior Common Room) committee, usually made up of second year students who stayed in that hall during their first year.

The facilities in the hall are often managed by an individual termed the Bursar. Residence Halls may have housekeeping staff to maintain the cleanliness of common rooms including lobbies, corridors, lounges, and bathrooms. Students are normally required to maintain the cleanliness of their own rooms and private or semi-private bathrooms, where offered.

Other dormitories

Military dormitories 
At most U.S. military installations, dormitories have replaced barracks. Much new construction includes private bathrooms, but most unaccompanied housing  still features bathrooms between pairs of rooms. Traditional communal shower facilities, typically one per floor, are now considered substandard and are being phased out.

U.S. military dormitory accommodations are generally intended for two junior enlisted single personnel per room, although in most cases this is slowly being phased out in favor of single occupancy in accordance with newer Department of Defense standards.

All branches of the U.S. military except the Air Force still refer to these dormitory-style accommodations as "barracks". The Air Force, in contrast, refers to all unaccompanied housing as "dormitories", including open-bay barracks used for basic training that house dozens per room, as well as unaccompanied housing for senior ranking personnel, which resemble apartments and are only found in a select number of overseas locations.

Sleeping dormitories 
In the US, China, UK, Ireland and Canada, a dormitory may be a room containing more than one bed. Examples are found in British boarding schools and many rooming houses such as hostels. CADs, or cold-air dormitories, are found in multi-level rooming houses such as fraternities, sororities, and cooperative houses. In CADs and in hostels, the room typically has very few furnishings except for beds. Such rooms can contain anywhere from three to 50 beds (though such very large dormitories are rare except perhaps as military barracks). Such rooms provide little or no privacy for the residents, and very limited storage for personal items in or near the beds. Cold-air dorms get their names from the common practice of keeping the windows open year-round, even in winter. The practice emerged based on the theory that circulation and cold air minimizes the spread of disease. Some communal bedrooms keep the name cold-air dorms or cold dorms despite having modern heating or cooling.

Company dormitories 

While the practice of housing employees in company-owned dormitories has dwindled, several companies continue this practice in the U.S. and other countries.

Cast members in the Disney College Program at the Walt Disney World Resort have the opportunity to meet and live with other cast members within their housing complexes in Lake Buena Vista, FL. In the Netherlands, the law forbids companies to offer housing to their employees, because the government wants to prevent people who have just lost their job adding to their stressful situation by having to search for new housing. In Japan, many of the larger companies as well as some of the ministries still offer to their newly graduated freshmen a room in a dormitory. A room in such a dormitory often comes with a communal cook (for the men) or rooms with furnished kitchen blocks (for the women). Usually the employees pay a very small amount of money to enable the men (especially) to save money to buy a house when they get married.

Prison dormitories 
Housing units in prisons that house more than the one or two inmates normally held in cells are referred to as "dormitories" as well. Housing arrangements can vary widely.  In some cases, dormitories in low-security prisons may almost resemble their academic counterparts, with the obvious differences of being locked at night, being administered by jailers, and subject to stricter institutional rules and fewer amenities. In other institutions, dormitories may be large rooms, often converted from other purposes such as gymnasiums in response to overcrowding, in which hundreds of prisoners have bunks and lockers.

Boarding school dormitories 

Boarding schools generally have dormitories as resident halls at least for junior or younger children around age 4 to 9 years of age. In classic British boarding schools these typically have bunk beds that have traditionally come to be associated with boarding schools. The Department for Children, Schools and Families, in conjunction with the Department of Health of the United Kingdom, has prescribed guidelines for dormitories in boarding schools. These regulations come under what is called as the National Boarding Standards.

The National Boarding Standards has prescribed minimum floor area or living space required for each student and other aspects of basic facilities. The minimum floor area of a dormitory accommodating two or more students is defined as the number of students sleeping in the dormitory multiplied by 4.2 m², plus 1.2 m². A minimum distance of 0.9 m should also be maintained between any two beds in a dormitory, bedroom or cubicle. In case students are provided with a cubicle, then each student must be provided with a window and a floor area of 5.0 m² at the least.  A bedroom for a single student should be at least of floor area of 6.0 m². Boarding schools must provide a total floor area of at least 2.3 m² living accommodation for every boarder.  This should also be incorporated with at least one bathtub or shower for every ten students. These are some of the few guidelines set by the department amongst many others. It could probably be observed that not all boarding schools around the world meet these minimum basic standards, despite their apparent appeal.

Floating dormitories

A floating dormitory is a water-borne vessel that provides, as its primary function, living quarters for students enrolled at an educational institution.  A floating dormitory functions as a conventional land-based dormitory in all respects except that the living quarters are aboard a floating vessel.  A floating dormitory is most often moored in place near the host educational facility and is not used for water transport.  Dormitory ships may also refer to vessels that provide water-borne housing in support of non-academic enterprises such as off-shore oil drilling operations.  Other vessels containing living quarters for students as ancillary support to the vessel's primary function – such as for providing maritime or other training given aboard the vessel – are more appropriately categorized as training ships.

Notable among floating dormitories is SS Stevens, a 473-foot, 14,893-ton ship operated by Stevens Institute of Technology, a technological university, in Hoboken, New Jersey. From 1968 to 1975, Stevens served as the floating dormitory for as many as 150 students of the institute.

See also 

 Barracks
 Hostel
 List of dormitory buildings
 Public housing
 Student Village (disambiguation)

References

External links 

Association of College and University Housing Officers - International
The Evolution of the College Dorm

House types